Ansar Khalifa Philippines, also referred to as Ansar al-Khilafah in the Philippines and Ansarul Khilafah Philippines ("Supporters of the Caliphate in the Philippines") is a Philippine-based militant group that emerged in August 2014 when it released a video pledging allegiance to ISIS. The Armed Forces of the Philippines, however, characterizes the group as "bandits" engaging in cattle rustling and extortion activities.

In 2019, Malaysia listed the group as terrorist organization.

Background
Ansar Khalifa Philippines is allegedly based in the provinces of South Cotabato and Sarangani and was initially led by Abu Sharifah. The group is considered to have the closest link to ISIS fighters in Syria among local terrorist groups in the Philippines.

Mohammad Jaafar Maguid, identified by Philippine security officials as the leader of Ansar Khalifa Philippines, was killed in an operation conducted by the National Intelligence Coordinating Agency and the Philippine National Police on January 5, 2017, in Kiamba, Sarangani. Maguid was said to have been trained by Zulkifli Abdhir in bomb-making. A few weeks later, the group's new leader, Abdullah Nilong, was captured by policemen in Polomolok, South Cotabato.

In October 2017, Maguid's widow, Filipina Karen Aizha Hamidon, was arrested for recruiting fighters and spreading propaganda related to the Battle of Marawi and the Maute group. Philippine authorities attributed 296 social media posts related to "recruiting to the ranks of the ISIS-affiliated Muslim militants" in Marawi to her authorship. Philippine government officials also identified her as a "close associate" of Musa Cerantonio, an Australian Islamic scholar and Islamic State of Iraq and the Levant supporter.

Activities
In November 2015, eight members of Ansar Khalifa Philippines were killed in a four-hour firefight against Philippine military units in Sultan Kudarat. One of the dead militants was identified as Abdul Fatah, an Indonesian national.

Philippine security officials have stated that Ansar Khalifa Philippines had cooperated with the Maute group in carrying out the 2016 Davao City bombing. In December 2016, two alleged members of the group were captured by Philippine National Police personnel after a bomb they planted in a trash bin near the United States embassy in Manila failed to explode.

The group is said to have worked with the Abu Sayyaf in carrying out the abortive plan to kidnap tourists in the Visayas region that culminated in the 2017 Bohol clash. Furthermore, they were reported to have contributed fighters in support of the Maute group-led assault that resulted in the Battle of Marawi.
In October 2018, Bassir Sahak, an  alleged leader of the group was killed in an encounter with state forces in Sitio Lebe, Barangay Daliao, Maasim.

References

Jihadist groups
Islamism in the Philippines
Factions of the Islamic State of Iraq and the Levant